Faye Leung is a Canadian businesswoman, best known for her involvement in the scandal that brought down the British Columbia government of Bill Vander Zalm in 1991 surrounding the sale of Fantasy Gardens. Raised in Vancouver and Victoria Chinatowns, she and her husband Dean are credited with helping to "prevent the destruction of Chinatown when they opposed a freeway going through the historic district."

Later, Leung "brokered the deal in which Vander Zalm, while in office, sold Fantasy Gardens World" to Tan Yu. "That sale led to Vander Zalm's breach of trust criminal trial in 1992."

The "ever-colourful" Leung is noted for "a wardrobe containing several hundred flamboyant hats and a habit of delivering high-speed, high-pitched, high-volume monologues." In her autobiography The Hat Lady Sings, she claimed that Vander Zalm still owed her 1.6 million dollars.

References

Canadian businesspeople
Living people
Year of birth missing (living people)